The Charter Community of Délı̨nę is located in the Sahtu Region of the Northwest Territories, Canada, on the western shore of Great Bear Lake and is  northwest of Yellowknife. Délı̨nę means "where the waters flow", a reference to the headwaters of the Great Bear River, Sahtúdé. It is the only settlement on the shores of Great Bear Lake as Fort Confidence was last used in the 1800s and Port Radium closed in 1982.

History

According to early records, a trading post was established in this general area as early as 1799 by the North West Company, but it did not last very many years. In 1825, Peter Warren Dease of the Hudson's Bay Company (HBC) erected an outpost here as the staging area and winter quarters for Sir John Franklin's second Arctic expedition of 1825–1827. It became known as Fort Franklin. Sir John Franklin's diary records that his men played ice sports very similar to what we now call hockey. As such, the modern-day town promotes itself as one of the birthplaces of the sport of ice hockey.

The HBC returned and established a post called Fort Norman a short distance west, and across the lake narrows, from John Franklin's original post, between 1863 and 1869, and then relocated Fort Norman to its current location at the confluence of the Mackenzie and Bear Rivers (now Tulita).

Fort Franklin as a modern-era trading post of the HBC was not established until later in the 19th century. It was constructed at one of the most productive Dene fisheries in the Mackenzie River drainage basin and was for the benefit of the Dene people who lived in near isolation along the shores of Great Bear Lake.

During World War II, the Canadian Government took over the mine and began to produce uranium for the then-secret American nuclear bomb project. Uranium product was transported from Port Radium by barge across Great Bear Lake where a portage network was established along the Bear River, across the bay from Fort Franklin, where many of the Dene men found work. As the risks associated with radioactive materials were not well communicated, it is believed that many of the Dene were exposed to dangerous amounts of radiation, which Déline residents believe resulted in the development of cancer and led to premature deaths.

The name of Fort Franklin was changed on 1 June 1993 to Délı̨nę, which means "where the waters flow", a reference to the headwaters of the Great Bear River, Sahtúdé.

Nearby Saoyú-ʔehdacho, the largest National Historic Site of Canada, was designated in 1997 and is jointly administered by Parks Canada and the Délı̨nę First Nation.

The fuel was removed from the truck by 2 am, 8 March.

Archaeology
John Franklin's 1825-1827 outpost was excavated by the Prince of Wales Northern Heritage Centre in 1987. The excavation uncovered beads, rings, and buttons indicating the extent of trade between the Dene and Europeans. The site is protected by the Northwest Territories Archaeological Sites Regulations. In 1996, the site was designated a National Historic Site of Canada.

Land claims and self-government
Délı̨nę is represented by the Délı̨nę First Nation and belongs to the Sahtu Dene Council. Through the council, they completed negotiations with the Government of Canada for a comprehensive land claim settlement in 1993.

Pursuant to the 1993 Sahtu Dene and Metis Comprehensive Land Claim Agreement, Délı̨nę subsequently negotiated a self-government agreement with the Government of the Northwest Territories and the Government of Canada.  The Final Self-Government Agreement was ratified by a majority vote of Délı̨nę's membership in March 2014.  The Final Self-Government Agreement was signed by its leadership, by the Government of the Northwest Territories and by the Government of Canada in February 2015, enacted by the Legislative Assembly of the Northwest Territories in March 2015, and enacted by the Parliament of Canada in June 2015 through Bill C-63. On September 1, 2016, the Délı̨nę Got'ı̨nę Government entered existence, legally assuming all of the responsibilities formerly held by the Délı̨nę First Nation, the Délı̨nę Land Corporation, and the Charter Community of Délı̨nę.

The Final Self-Government Agreement is a Treaty within the meaning of ss. 25 and 35 of the Constitution Act, 1982. Through it, much of the Indian Act no longer applies to Délı̨nę's First Nations citizens. Merging a First Nations band government and a municipal government into a single authority, its structure is unique in the Northwest Territories.

Demographics 

In the 2016 Census, there were 495 Indigenous people made up of 485 First Nations, Sahtu Dene people speaking North Slavey and 10 Métis people.

Gallery

Climate
Délı̨nę has a subarctic climate (Köppen climate classification: Dfc), with mild summers and severely cold winters. Precipitation is very low, but is somewhat higher in the summer than at other times of the year.

See also
 List of municipalities in the Northwest Territories
Déline Airport
Déline Water Aerodrome

References

 John Price, "Our own atomic victims," Victoria Times-Colonist

External links

 Welcome to Délįne

Charter communities in the Northwest Territories
Communities in the Sahtu Region
Mining communities in the Northwest Territories
Dene communities
Hudson's Bay Company forts
1825 establishments in the British Empire
Road-inaccessible communities of the Northwest Territories